Mar del Plata is a city on the coast of the Atlantic Ocean, in Buenos Aires Province, Argentina. It is the seat of General Pueyrredón district. Mar del Plata is the second largest city in Buenos Aires Province. The name "Mar del Plata"  is a shortening of "Mar del Rio de la Plata," and has the meaning of "sea of the Rio de la Plata basin" or "adjoining sea to the (River) Plate region". Mar del Plata is one of the major fishing ports and the biggest seaside beach resort in Argentina.

Economy 

As part of the Argentine recreational coast, tourism is Mar del Plata's main economic activity with seven million tourists visiting the city in 2006. Mar del Plata has a sophisticated tourist infrastructure with numerous hotels, restaurants, casinos, theatres and other tourist attractions. Mar del Plata is also an important sports centre with a multi-purpose Olympic style stadium (first used for the 1978 World Cup and later upgraded for the 1995 Pan American Games), five golf courses and many other facilities.

As an important fishing port, industry concentrates on fish processing and at least two large shipyards.

The area is also host to other light industry, such as textile, food manufacturing and polymers.
There is a well-developed packaging machines industry, its quality being recognized in international markets. One of these companies was one of the pioneers in the automatic packaging of tea bags, exporting its original machine-designs abroad. Another company also exports its products and has sold royalties to other countries.

During the mid-1980s, Mar del Plata saw the birth of electronics factories, focused mostly on the telecommunications field, with two of them,  Nexuscom and DelSat, succeeding in the international market. By the 2010s, a local technology company, PCBOX, was manufacturing and developing personal computers, tablet computers, smartphones and action-cams.

Also during the decade of 2010, the development of the software industry resulted in the formation of 92 companies and 440 microbusiness. One of these companies, Making Sense, opened offices at San Antonio, Austin and Boston, in the United States. Along with the American COPsync, Inc, the company developed in 2013 the software for VidTac, an in-car video system for law enforcement, and the internet landing page application Lander, bought by the Silicon Valley company QuestionPro in 2016.

Since the 2000s, a local company builds and develops oil industry equipment, with customers in the United States, Russia, Oman and Egypt.

Located southwest of the city there are quartzite quarries. The stone is traditionally used in construction. There is a huge area of farms in the rural areas surrounding the city, specialized mostly in the cultivation of vegetables. In 2012, Mar del Plata became a wine-producing area, when a wine company from Mendoza province produced 20,000 lt from a vineyard at Chapadmalal beach from grape varieties such as Sauvignon blanc, Chardonnay, Riesling and Gewürztraminer. Since then, the local winery turned into a tourist attraction. Microbeweries flourished during the 2010s, amounting by 2016 to one third of the national production.

Although the area had suffered from a high rate of unemployment from 1995 to 2003, Mar del Plata has seen 46,000 new jobs created from the third quarter of 2003 to the third quarter of 2008, representing an increase of 22%.

The 2008 Davis Cup Final was held in Mar del Plata and, after being shut for a decade the Gran Hotel Provincial (one of the largest hotels in Argentina) was reopened by the Madrid-based NH Hotels, in 2009.

Mar del Plata continues to lead Argentina's room availability: of 440,000 registered hotel rooms nationwide in early 2009, the city was home to nearly 56,000 (5,000 more than Buenos Aires).

Transportation 

Mar del Plata is served by Astor Piazzolla International Airport (MDQ/SAZM) with daily flights to Buenos Aires served by Aerolíneas Argentinas and weekly flights to Patagonia served by LADE.

Due to COVID-19 pandemic, flights were reduced just to two daily flights to Buenos Aires served by Aerolineas Argentinas.

Route 88 connects to Necochea and Route 226 to Balcarce, Tandil and Olavarría.

The city has a bus and train station serving most cities in Argentina. There are two daily trains to Buenos Aires' Constitución station using new trains operated by Trenes Argentinos. These services are part of the General Roca Railway, owned by the government company Nuevos Ferrocarriles Argentinos.

Notes
 (1) Its tracks were extended to connect with the bus terminal opened in 2009, also building new train platforms.
 (2) Operated as the bus terminal of the city until 2009.

History 

Pre-Spanish era: The region was inhabited by Günuna Kena nomads (also known as northern Tehuelches). They were later (after the 11th century) strongly influenced by the Mapuche culture.

1577–1857: First European explorers. Sir Francis Drake made a reconnaissance of the coast and its sea lion colonies; Don Juan de Garay explored the area by land a few years later, in 1581. After holding the Englishmen as prisoners, they returned Morris and his surviving companions to London in 1746. First colonization attempt by Jesuit Order near Laguna de los Padres ended in disaster (1751).

1857–1874: The Portuguese entrepreneur José Coelho de Meirelles, taking advantage of the country's abundance of wild cattle, built a pier and a factory for salted meat near Cabo Corrientes, but the business only lasted a few years.

1874–1886: Patricio Peralta Ramos acquired the now abandoned factory along with the surrounding terrain, and founded the town on February 10, 1874. Basque rancher Pedro Luro bought a part of Peralta Ramos land for agricultural production. First docks also erected around this time.

1886–1911: The railway line from Buenos Aires, built by the Buenos Aires Great Southern reached Mar del Plata in 1886; the first hotels started their activity. The upper-class people from Buenos Aires became the first tourists of the new born village. They also established a local government that reflected their conservative ideals. Build-up of a French style resort. On 19 July 1907, the provincial legislature approved a bill that declared Mar del Plata as a city.

1911–1930: The residents, mostly newly arrived emigrants from Europe, demanded and obtained the control of the Municipality administration. The socialists were the mainstream political force in this period, carrying out social reforms and public investment. The main port was also built and inaugurated in 1916.

1930–1946: A military coup reinstated the Conservative hegemony in politics through electoral fraud and corruption, but at local levels they were quite progressive, their policies viewed in some way as a continuity of the socialist trend. In 1932, the construction of National Route 2 was completed, which connected Mar del Plata to Buenos Aires. Before this, a dirt road connected Mar del Plata to Buenos Aires using a different route, required almost two days to travel by car. The seaside Casino complex opened in 1939, was designed by architect Alejandro Bustillo, dates from this period.

1946–1955: Birth of the Peronist movement. A coalition between socialists and radicals defeated this new party by a narrow margin in Mar del Plata, but by 1948 Peronism came to dominate the local administration. The massive tourism, triggered by the welfare politics of Perón and the surge of the middle class marked a huge growth in the city's economy.

1955–1970: After the fall of Perón, the socialists regained the upper hand in local politics; the city reached the peak in activities like construction business and building industry. There was massive emigration from other regions of Argentina.

1970–1989: Slight decline of tourism demand, counterbalanced by the increase of other industries such as fishing and machinery. General infrastructure renewal under the military rule. The centrist Radical Civic Union becomes the main political force after the return of Democracy in 1983.

1989–2010: Though the Peronism replaced the radicals in central government amid a national financial crisis, the latter party continued to rule in Mar del Plata. Some resurgence of mass tourism in the early '90s was followed by a deep social crisis in town, with an increase of poverty, jobless rates and emigration. By contrast, the first decade of the 21st century shows an amazingly quick recovery in all sectors of the ailing economy.

In November 2005 the city hosted the 4th Summit of the Americas.

Culture 

Mar del Plata is the most popular destination for conventions in Argentina after Buenos Aires. Mar del Plata has a wide range of services in this sector. The summer season hosts over fifty theatrical plays.

Shows and festivals 

 The Mar del Plata International Film Festival, the only A class accredited film festival in Latin America.
 The Fiesta Nacional del Mar ("National Sea Festival") with the election and coronation of the Sea Queen and her princesses, which takes place in December as the official inauguration of the summer season.
 The Premios Estrella de Mar ("Sea Star Awards") which honor the best stage plays and shows of the season.
 The Valencian Falles week, a local reenactment of the Valencian event conducted by the Valencian community.
 The Mar del Plata Fashion Show, along with a number of fashion parades that gathers the best haute couture designers.
 The Fiesta Nacional de los Pescadores (National Fishermen's Festival), a colourful display of seafarers' tradition and cuisine.
 Mar del Plata has also hosted the 1995 Pan American Games, the 2001 Rugby World Cup Sevens, the 2003 Parapan American Games, the 2005 FIBA Under-21 World Championship, and co-hosted the 1978 FIFA World Cup and the 2001 FIFA World Youth Championship.
 Since 1987 Mar del Plata annually hosts the Mar del Plata Marathon, in early December.
 The 38th and 53rd International Mathematical Olympiad was held in Mar del Plata in 1997 and 2012.
 The Festival Internacional de Poesia del Atlantico International Poetry Festival of the Atlantic, is an international poetry festival. It began in 2013 and for its second edition in 2014 it gathered more than 210 poets from Argentina, Uruguay, Mexico, Iran, Chile, Peru and Cuba. It's part of the Moviento Poetico Mundial World Poetry Movement.
 The Prosa Mutante is a cycle of literary experiences and arts collective established in January 2013 that takes place since then every Thursday from 20:00 at Piano Bar in which stage over 100 local, national and international artists have performed.

The local Government sponsors a Symphonic Orchestra.

Nightlife 

Mar del Plata has a wide variety of clubs located by district: the area of Escollera Norte (known for its quantity of pubs and nightclubs) and Constitution Avenue.

Museums 
 The Juan Carlos Castagnino Municipal Museum of Art.
 The Museum of the Port of Mar del Plata Cleto Ciocchini.
 The Museum of Contemporary Art MAR.
 The Museum of Natural Science Lorenzo Scaglia, specialized in Paleontology of the Quaternary species around the region.
 The Mar del Plata Museum of the Sea, which included one of the most complete collections of sea snails of the World. The museum has been closed to the public since September 2012.
 Villa Victoria, a vintage wooden house, the former residence of the late writer Victoria Ocampo, now a place for art expositions and classical music.
 The Submarine Force Museum, located close to the Mar del Plata Naval Base.

Personalities

 Gabriel Amato (born October 22, 1970), former international soccer player. Former forward of Boca Juniors, River Plate, Rangers FC and Grêmio.
 Inés Arrondo (born November 28, 1977), field hockey player, winner along with the national team of an Olympic silver medal in Sydney 2000, the bronze medal in Athens 2004 and the World Cup in 2002.
 Héctor Babenco (1946–2016), movie director of Hollywood films such as Kiss of the Spider Woman and Ironweed. Raised in Mar del Plata.
 Mario Benedetti (1945), electronics engineer, the main Argentine scientist involved in the Large Hadron Collider project. He is also the owner of Tío Curzio, one of the most fashionable restaurants in the city.
 Erica Vanessa Bibbó (1985), the first female commander of a naval unit in the Argentine navy.
 Amado Boudou (born November 19, 1962), former Vice President of Argentina.
 Alberto Bruzzone (1907–1994), painter, was born in San Juan but chose Mar del Plata as his home city.
 Germán Burgos (born April 16, 1969), former goalkeeper who played two World Cups. Currently, he is oriented to music.
 Macarena Achaga (born March 5, 1992), actress, model, and singer.
 Homero Cárpena (1910–2001), actor, playwright and filmmaker.
 Juan Carlos Castagnino (1908-1972), painter.

 Juan Curuchet (born February 4, 1965), former road bicycle racer and track cyclist, winner of the Men's Madison gold medal at the 2008 Summer Olympics along with Walter Pérez.
 Martin Donovan (not to be confused with American actor Martin Donovan), Hollywood screenwriter and producer, co-author of the screenplay of movies like Death Becomes Her  and Loving Couples.
 Laura Echarte, agricultural engineer, researcher in crop physiology studies, winner of a 2007 L'Oréal-Unesco international fellowship for Women.
 Juan Eduardo Esnáider (1973), international soccer player. Former forward of Espanyol de Barcelona, Atlético de Madrid, Juventus and River Plate.
 Nacha Guevara (1940), singer and actress.
 Carlos Enrique Díaz Sáenz Valiente (1917–1956), shooter, silver medalist at the 1948 Summer Olympics and World Champion in 1947.
 Jorge Lanata (born September 12, 1960), journalist and writer.
 Mariano Mignini (born 1975), Argentine footballer.
 Maria Gabriela Palomo, marine biologist, also winner of the L'Oréal-Unesco junior award in 2003 for her works on port-areas environmental pollution.
 Ástor Piazzolla (1921-1992), composer and musician.
 Ricardo Piglia (1941–2017), writer born in Adrogué but raised in Mar del Plata.
 Alfonsina Storni (1892-1938), poet.
 Auro Tiribelli (1908–2006), architect, the main representative of the Mar del Plata style.
 Guillermo Vilas (1952), top-ten international tennis player, popularizer of the between-the-legs tweener shot, also called the Gran Willy after him.
 Selem Safar (1987), professional basketball player.
 Emi Buendía (1996) Footballer currently playing for Aston Villa F.C.
 Sergio Torres (1981), former player and player assistance manager for Eastbourne Borough in National League South.
 Romina Malaspina (1994) Model, reality star, showgirl, influencer, television host, vedette, actress and journalist.
 Emiliano Martínez (1992), Football player for Aston Villa F.C.
 Franchu Feuillassier (1998), Football player for SD Eibar
 Shaiel Peters (2003) Archer, South American índoor Senior Champion, Argentinian Índoor Senior Champion and récord holder.
 Milton Martinez (1991), professional skateboarder and 2019 Thrasher Magazine Skateboarder of the Year.
 Marcos Siebert (1996), racing driver

Architecture 

The development of the city as a seasonal summer resort in the early 20th century led upper class tourists from Buenos Aires to build a European-inspired architecture, based mainly on the picturesque and later on the art deco styles. This gave Mar del Plata the nickname of the Argentine Biarritz. The building industry became the main non-seasonal activity of the town by 1920.

During the 1930s, 1940s, and beyond, local architects and builders, like Auro Tiribelli, Arturo Lemmi, Alberto Córsico-Picollini and Raúl Camusso recreated and transformed the picturesque values into a middle-class scale, marking the beginning of a vernacular architecture, called Mar del Plata Style, consisting in small samples of the luxury-laden summer residences of high society, built for the summer visitor as well as for the local resident.

These chalets were built with stone façades, gable roofs covered with Spanish or French tiles, prominent eaves and front porches. This gives the town some distinctive urban character compared with other Argentine cities, despite the fact that the growing mass of tourists in the '60s imposed the construction of large apartment buildings and skyscrapers as the predominant architectural style downtown.

Climate 
Mar del Plata has an oceanic climate (Cfb, according to the Köppen climate classification), with humid and moderate summers and relatively cool winters, although polar air masses from Antarctica are frequent. The West-Southwest winds can take the temperature below  between mid May and early October, while the Southeast ones (the so-called Sudestada) are stronger, producing coastal showers and rough seas, as well as strong squalls, but the cold is much less intense. There is fog in the last days of fall, and springtime is often marred by sea winds and sudden temperature changes. 

There are about six days of frost each year in the city center, and almost 27 recorded at the airport. The average dates for the first and last frost are May 23 and October 4 respectively.  Snowfall is not uncommon, but snow accumulation on the ground is rare, a phenomenon that takes place every six years or so, according to the last 40 years of data. Among the best known such occurrences in the last decades were the 1975 and 1991 snowstorms, but there were also snow accumulations in 1994 and 1997 in the highest hills area of Sierra de los Padres, in 1995 along the southern coast; the other two during the first hours of July 10, 2004 and July 15, 2010, and again in Sierra de los Padres and the southern coast on September 11, 2015. There were flurries in September 1986, June 2007, July 2011 and August 2013.

Government 

Mar del Plata is the head of the department of General Pueyrredón. The current Mayor of the city and department is Guillermo Montenegro, of the Juntos por el Cambio party.

The town council has some legislative powers. The term of office for both the Mayor and council members is four years.

In 1919, Mar del Plata became the first town in South America to have a Socialist Mayor, a son of Italian Immigrants, Teodoro Bronzini. The Socialist Party would dominate the city political landscape for most of the 20th century.

Mar del Plata has had 109 Mayors and Commissioners from 1881 to the present.

There is an extensive but interesting work by the American political scientist Susan Stokes about the democratic process in Mar del Plata since 1983 in comparison to other regions of Argentina.  One of the main thesis of her articles is that the social and economic development of Mar del Plata was quite atypical, with a strong prevalence of middle-class values that discouraged the policy of clientelism that is the common background in other urban environments of Argentina.

Education
The area has many Schools and Universities, some of these are private or public. It once had a German school, Johann-Gutenberg-Schule.
There is a wide variety of schools dedicated to the education of art:
Universidad Nacional de Mar del Plata (UNMdP): Public university with various majors.
 Escuela de Artes Visuales M.A Malharro: A Higher education school based on modern visual arts, it counts with graduated departments of Graphic Design, Photography, Illustration, Teacher education, Freelancer Artist, Scenography and Film.
 Polivalente de Arte (Escuela de Educación Secundaria Especializada en Arte Nº 1): School of Secondary education that also works as a vocational school in the fields of Art, Music or Dance.

Also, there are two Conservatories (Classical and popular music), a Vocational School of Art, and a Municipal School of Classical and Modern Dance.

Media

Television
Channel 10, Mar del Plata

Sport

Mar del Plata's most popular football (soccer) teams are Aldosivi, Alvarado and Kimberley. Aldosivi plays in Primera division, Alvarado and Kimberley in the Torneo Argentino B.

Peñarol and Quilmes de Mar del Plata are the most popular basketball teams. Peñarol have won eight official tournaments (Súper 8, FIBA Americas League, five National Leagues, InterLigas, and Copa Argentina). Mar del Plata hosted the 2011 FIBA Americas Championship, where the city's basketball fans supported Argentina's national basketball team to win the gold medal. All games were played in the 8,000 seat Polideportivo Islas Malvinas.

For many years, the city hosted a strong international chess tournament.

Mar del Plata hosted six matches in the 1978 FIFA World Cup at the Estadio José María Minella, which was built for the sporting event.

The city also hosted the 1995 Pan American Games and the 2001 Rugby World Cup Sevens.

The city is home to Argentine Bandy Union.

In 2003 Mar del Plata hosted the 2nd Parapan American Games that featured 1,500 athletes from 28 countries competed in nine sporting events. This was the last Parapan American Games that was not tied to the Pan American Games.

The 20th World Transplant Games were held in the city from 23 to 30 August 2015.

Mar del Plata was the starting point for the 2012 Dakar Rally.

International relations

Twin towns – Sister cities
Mar del Plata is twinned with:

Gallery

References

Further reading 
 Cacopardo, Fernando A. & others: Mar del Plata, Ciudad e Historia. Alianza Editorial S.A./UNMDP, Madrid/Buenos Aires, 1997. . 
 Rocatagliata, Juan A. & others: Mar del Plata y su Región. Sociedad Argentina de Estudios Geográficos, Buenos Aires, 1984. 
 Anniversary Editions of La Capital newspaper: 1955, 1980, 1985, 2005. 
 Barili, Roberto T.: Mar del Plata, Reseña Histórica. Published by the Municipality of Gral. Pueyrredón, Mar del Plata, 1964. 
 Zago, Manrique: Mar del Plata, Argentina. Manrique Zago Ed., 1997. (Bilingual Edition)
 Stokes, Susan C.:Do Informal Institutions Make Democracy Work? Accounting for Accountability in Argentina. University of Chicago. Prepared for presentation at the conference, "Informal Institutions in Latin America". University of Notre Dame, April 23–24, 2003.
 Shapiro, Ian and Bedi, Sonu : Political Contingency: Studying the Unexpected, the Accidental, and the Unforeseen. New York University Press, 2007. 
 Helmke, Gretchen and Levitsky, Steven: Informal Institutions and Democracy:Lessons from Latin America. Johns Hopkins University Press, 2006.

External links 

  
 
 National University of Mar del Plata 

 
Populated places in Buenos Aires Province
Port settlements in Argentina
Seaside resorts in Argentina
Populated coastal places in Argentina
Populated places established in 1874
1874 establishments in Argentina
Cities in Argentina